Garudinia bimaculata is a moth of the family Erebidae first described by Walter Rothschild in 1912. It is found on Borneo and Sulawesi and in Taiwan.

References

Cisthenina
Moths described in 1912